Woodland Cree 227 is an Indian reserve of the Woodland Cree First Nation in Alberta, located within Northern Sunrise County. It is 60 kilometres northeast of Peace River.

References

Indian reserves in Alberta